Antonette M. Zeiss (née Raskoff) is an American clinical psychologist. Zeiss was chief consultant for mental health services at the Central Office of the United States Department of Veterans Affairs  – the first woman and the first psychologist and nonphysician to hold this position. In 2013 she received the APA Award for Lifetime Contributions to Psychology from the American Psychological Association (APA).

Biography 
Zeiss grew up in Santa Cruz, California with two brothers in the 1950s. She credited her mother as teaching her to "Never turn your back on a wave. If you turn around, face the wave, dive under it and don't be afraid of it." Her advice to women in leaderships includes being nice, being responsible, staying involved, having vision, and growing things.

Zeiss received her undergraduate degree at Stanford University. At Stanford, Zeiss did research on delayed gratification, including the famous Stanford marshmallow experiment together with Walter Mischel. She completed her PhD in Clinical Psychology at the University of Oregon in 1977, mentored by Peter Lewinsohn.

Antonette Zeiss is married to fellow psychologist Robert Zeiss, whom she met as an undergraduate at Stanford University. They live in Santa Cruz, California.

Research and work 
Zeiss worked as a faculty member at Arizona State University and as a visiting faculty member Stanford University. Afterwards she joined the Department of Veterans Affairs (VA), where she was Director of Interdisciplinary Team Training in Geriatrics and later Director of Psychology Training at the Palo Alto Health Care System. In 2005 she became the deputy chief consultant for the Office of Mental Health Services at the Department of Veterans Affairs Central Office (VACO), from 2010 to 2012 she was chief consultant. Her research career focused on cognitive behavioral therapy in the treatment of depression, and mental health and sexuality in later life.

Zeiss is active in the Women in Leadership Special Interest Group of the Association of VA Psychology Leaders. The group wants to promote topics relevant for female psychologists in leadership positions and support them. She was co-chair of this group in the past, as well. In 2010 the Association of VA Psychology Leaders established the Antonette Zeiss Distinguished Leadership Award to honor VA psychologists who have shown expert leadership during their career and a strong commitment to the work of providing health care for Veterans. Zeiss herself was the first recipient of this award.

After her retirement in 2012, Zeiss served as a member of the APA Board of Professional Affairs.

Books 

 Heinemann, G. D., & Zeiss, A. M. (Eds.). (2002). Team performance in health care: Assessment and development. Kluwer Academic/Plenum Publishers.
Zeiss, R. A., & Zeiss, A. (1978). Prolong your pleasure. Pocket books.

Representative papers 

 Zeiss, A. M., Gallagher-Thompson, D., Lovett, S., Rose, J., & McKibbin, C. (1999). Self-efficacy as a mediator of caregiver coping: Development and testing of an assessment model. Journal of Clinical Geropsychology, 5(3), 221–230.
 Zeiss, A. M., & Karlin, B. E. (2008). Integrating mental health and primary care services in the Department of Veterans Affairs health care system. Journal of Clinical Psychology in Medical Settings, 15(1), 73–78.
 Zeiss, A., & Kasl-Godley, J. (2001). Sexuality in older adults' relationships. Generations, 25(2), 18–25.
 Zeiss, A. M., & Lewinsohn, P. M. (1988). Enduring deficits after remissions of depression: A test of the scar hypothesis. Behaviour Research and Therapy, 26(2), 151–158.
 Zeiss, A. M., Lewinsohn, P. M., & Muñoz, R. F. (1979). Nonspecific improvement effects in depression using interpersonal skills training, pleasant activity schedules, or cognitive training. journal of Consulting and Clinical Psychology, 47(3), 427–439.
 Zeiss, A. M., Lewinsohn, P. M., Rohde, P., & Seeley, J. R. (1996). Relationship of physical disease and functional impairment to depression in older people. Psychology and Aging, 11(4), 572–581.

Awards and honors 
2004: Society of Clinical Geropsychology's Distinguished Clinical Mentorship Award

2006: Award for the Advancement of Psychology and Aging from the APA Committee on Aging (CONA)

2007: APA Presidential Citation

2009: United States Presidential Rank Award of Meritorious

2010: Antonette Zeiss Distinguished Leadership Award

2011: Lifetime Achievement Award from the Association for Behavioral and Cognitive Therapy

2013: Award for Lifetime Contributions to Psychology from the American Psychological Association

References

External links 
 

American women psychologists
20th-century American psychologists
20th-century American women scientists
21st-century American women scientists
21st-century American psychologists
University of Oregon alumni
Arizona State University faculty
Stanford University faculty
United States Department of Veterans Affairs officials
Living people
Year of birth missing (living people)
American women academics